Quest, a low-powered, schooner-rigged steamship that sailed from 1917 until sinking in 1962, is best known as the polar exploration vessel of the Shackleton–Rowett Expedition of 1921–1922. It was aboard this vessel that Sir Ernest Shackleton died on 5 January 1922 while the vessel was in harbour in South Georgia. Prior to and after the Shackleton-Rowett Expedition, Quest operated in commercial service as a seal-hunting vessel or sealer. Quest was also the primary expedition vessel of the British Arctic Air Route Expedition to the east coast of the island of Greenland in 1930–1931.

The vessel has been variously rated at 209 and 214 gross register tons, possibly due to the 1924 refit described below.

Shackleton-Rowett Expedition

Quest was originally built in Risør, Norway in 1917 as the wooden-hulled sealer Foca I or Foca II. She was the polar expedition vessel of the Shackleton-Rowett Expedition of 1921–1922.  The vessel was renamed Quest by Lady Emily Shackleton, wife of expedition leader Ernest Shackleton.  At the expense of expedition financier John Quiller Rowett, Quest was refitted for the expedition with modifications overseen by sailing master Frank Worsley, including re-rigging and the addition of a deckhouse.  Shackleton was a member of the Royal Yacht Squadron, and so for this voyage Quest bore the RYS suffix and flew the White Ensign.

Sailing from London for the Southern Ocean on 17 September 1921, the ship reached South Georgia on 4 January 1922 while preparing to enter Antarctic waters. The following night Shackleton, the commander of the expedition, died aboard the vessel while she was at anchor in Grytviken. This ended all prospects of the expedition's carrying out its original program of exploring the Antarctic coastline of Enderby Land.  Led by Frank Wild, Quest carried out a desultory survey of the Weddell Sea area before returning to the South Atlantic. Quest touched the Tristan da Cunha archipelago in early May, and at Inaccessible Island, ornithologist Hubert Wilkins took type specimens of the grosbeak bunting.

The expedition returned to England in July 1922, having posted disappointing results that were attributed both to replacement commander Wild's alcoholism and deficiencies in Quest's performance in polar sea ice. The weakly powered ship's engine caused continuous difficulties, and the vessel's straight stem made her unsuitable for use in icy seas.

East Greenland Expeditions
Quest was again refitted in Norway in 1924. During the refit, the sealer's Shackleton-Rowett deckhouse was salvaged for shore use. In 1928 the refitted vessel participated in the effort to rescue the survivors of the Italia Arctic airship crash. In 1930, the aging sealer, described as a "broad-beamed, tubby little ship, decks stacked with gear", served as the primary expedition vessel and transport from London to eastern Greenland for the explorers of the British Arctic Air Route Expedition led by Gino Watkins in 1930. Later she was the expedition ship of Count Gaston Micard's East Greenland ventures between 1932 and 1936.

Current status
Quest returned to service as a sealing vessel after 1930. In 1935 she was used by the British East Greenland Expedition. During World War II the wooden-hulled vessel was pressed into service as a minesweeper and light cargo vessel. The small ship returned to sealing duties in 1946. On 5 May 1962, while on a seal-hunting expedition, Quest was holed by ice and sank off the north coast of Labrador.  The crew was saved.

Parts of the former deckhouse, including Shackleton's cabin in 1921–1922, survive and, as of 2021 are in the Athy Heritage Center – Museum in Ireland. The crow's nest, made from a barrel, is in the crypt of All Hallows-by-the-Tower, London.

An archival collection of 476 photographs from the Quest/Shackleton-Rowett Expedition is maintained by the State Library of New South Wales in Sydney, Australia.

See also
 List of Antarctic exploration ships from the Heroic Age, 1897–1922

References

External links
   

Exploration ships of the United Kingdom
Sealing ships
Schooners
Steamships of Norway
Steamships of the United Kingdom
World War II minesweepers of the United Kingdom
Merchant ships of Norway
Maritime incidents in 1962
1917 ships
Ships built in Norway
Ships of Nortraship
Ernest Shackleton